Radwell Cottage is a historic cure cottage located at Saranac Lake in the town of Harrietstown, Franklin County, New York.  It was built about 1896 and is a -story, wood-frame dwelling with clapboard siding and a gable roof on a native fieldstone foundation.  It features a flat-roofed cure porch in an irregular "L" shape that bends outward from the facade.  A second cure porch is rectangular and supported on posts.

It was listed on the National Register of Historic Places in 1992.

References

Houses on the National Register of Historic Places in New York (state)
Colonial Revival architecture in New York (state)
Houses completed in 1896
Houses in Franklin County, New York
National Register of Historic Places in Franklin County, New York